Benjamin Dionne (1798 – June 28, 1883) was a businessman and political figure in Canada East.

He was born at Kamouraska in 1798. He entered business at Cacouna as a merchant around 1825. He served as lieutenant-colonel in the local militia and also as mayor of Cacouna. In 1854, he was elected to the Legislative Assembly of the Province of Canada for Témiscouata; he was reelected in 1858.

He died at Cacouna in 1883.

His daughter Arthémise married seigneur Charles Bertrand who became a member of the Canadian House of Commons.

External links

1798 births
1883 deaths
Members of the Legislative Assembly of the Province of Canada from Canada East
Mayors of places in Quebec
People from Bas-Saint-Laurent